Godfrey Thomas Vigne (1 September 1801 – 12 July 1863) was an English amateur cricketer and traveller.

Early life 
Vigne was born on 1 September 1801 at Walthamstow, then in Essex, the eldest son of Thomas Vigne. He entered Harrow School in 1817, became a barrister in 1824, and was a member of Lincoln's Inn.

Cricketing career
He was mainly associated with Hampshire sides and he made 11 known appearances in first-class matches from 1819 to 1845.

Travels 
In 1831 Vigne left England for Persia, and then travelled to India. He spent the next seven years travelling in north west India and Central Asia. Between 1835 and 1838 he travelled extensively in Kashmir and Ladakh and was the first European known to have visited Baltistan. He was the first to describe Nanga Parbat.

In 1836 Vigne visited Afghanistan, and met the emir, Dost Mohammed. He was said to be the first Englishman to have visited Kabul. After 1852 Vigne travelled in Mexico, Nicaragua, the West Indies and the United States. He published several books describing his travels.

In 1841, the urial, a wild sheep living in Central and Southern Asia, was given the scientific name Ovis vignei in his honour.

Works
Outline of a Route Through the Panj-áb, Kábul, Kashmír, and into Little Tibet, in the Years 1834-8. Publisher: Journal of the Royal Geographical Society of London, Volume 9, 1 January 1839
A personal narrative of a visit to Ghuzni, Kabul, and Afghanistan, and of a residence at the court of Dost Mohamed with notices of Runjit Sing, Khiva, and the Russian expedition. With illus. from drawings made by the author on the spot. Publisher: Whitacker & Co., London, 1840 
Travels in Kashmir, Ladak, Iskardo, the countries adjoining the mountain-course of the Indus, and the Himalaya, north of the Panjab. Volume I.  Publisher: Henry Colburn London, 1842 
Travels in Kashmir, Ladak, Iskardo, the countries adjoining the mountain-course of the Indus, and the Himalaya, north of the Panjab. Volume II.  Publisher: Henry Colburn London,  1842  
Observation on the Vegetation and Products of Afghanistan, Kaschmir and Tibet by J. Forbes Royal M.D. F.R.S.

References

External sources
 Vigne, Godfrey Thomas by Edward Irving Carlyle in: Dictionary of National Biography, 1885–1900, Volume 58
 Books by Godfrey Thomas Vigne Internet Archive – online
 Watercolour Paintings by Godfrey Thomas Vigne in VAM Museum

1801 births
1863 deaths
English cricketers
English cricketers of 1826 to 1863
Hampshire cricketers
Marylebone Cricket Club cricketers
English travel writers
Explorers of Central Asia
People educated at Harrow School
People from Walthamstow
English cricketers of 1787 to 1825
A to K v L to Z cricketers
Writers about Kashmir
Marylebone Cricket Club Second 9 with 3 Others cricketers